Blues for Red is a solo piano album by Paul Bley recorded in Italy in 1989 and released on the Red label in 1992.

Reception

Allmusic awarded the album 4 stars, stating: "While this is not an album that would serve well as an introduction to this wonderful performer, it will prove particularly rewarding to those who are familiar with the pianist's work and wish to observe some different facets of his playing."

Track listing
All compositions by Paul Bley
 "Blues for Red" - 8:08  
 "Rear Projection" - 7:20  
 "Into the Night" - 5:24  
 "Above Board" - 5:50  
 "Delirious Boogie" - 6:06  
 "Underground" - 6:43  
 "Up Hill" - 4:14  
 "Latin Thing" - 5:24  
 "Downtown" - 6:24  
 "Late Night Blue" - 2:30  
 "Baby Narrows" - 4:08  
 "Capri - Cious" - 2:55  
 "Solo Mio" - 3:20  
 "Exit" - 0:50

Personnel 
Paul Bley – piano

References 

1989 albums
Paul Bley albums
Red Records albums
Solo piano jazz albums